{{DISPLAYTITLE:C13H26}}
The molecular formula C13H26 (molar mass: 182.34 g/mol, exact mass: 182.2035 u) may refer to:

 Cyclotridecane
 Tridecene

Molecular formulas